"When We Are in Need" is the eighth episode of the American post-apocalyptic drama television series The Last of Us. The episode was written by series co-creator Craig Mazin and directed by Ali Abbasi. It aired on HBO on March 5, 2023. In the episode, Ellie (Bella Ramsey) attempts to protect Joel (Pedro Pascal). She encounters a group of survivors led by a preacher, David (Scott Shepherd), who wants vengeance against Joel and shows interest in Ellie.

The episode was filmed in February 2022 in Calgary, Alberta. Troy Baker, who portrayed Joel in the video games on which the series is based, guest starred as James; co-creators Mazin and Neil Druckmann considered his inclusion important due to his proximity to the games. The episode received positive reviews, with praise for its direction, cinematography, and performances of Ramsey and Shepherd, though some critics found its pacing rushed. It was watched by 8.1 million viewers on its first day.

Plot 
After discovering Joel's (Pedro Pascal) wound is infected, Ellie ventures out to find food. While hunting a deer, she encounters David (Scott Shepherd) and James (Troy Baker). She makes a deal to trade the deer for penicillin, which James returns to camp to obtain. Meanwhile, David, a preacher, explains he was a teacher, and found God after the outbreak and is now the leader of a group of survivors. He reveals the man who stabbed—and was subsequently killed by—Joel was a member of his group. Ellie runs away after James gives her the penicillin under David's orders.

Ellie returns to Joel and injects him with penicillin. The following day, she spots David and James with a group of men seeking vengeance against Joel. She flees on horseback to draw them away from Joel, but is captured after James shoots and kills her horse. David places her in a cage at his camp. After Ellie notices an ear on the floor, David reveals he has been feeding his group the flesh of their deceased. He tells her he admires her strengths and violence and they could begin a relationship, but she breaks his finger while failing to steal his keys. Meanwhile, Joel awakens and kills one of David's men, then tortures and kills two more to discover Ellie's whereabouts.

Ellie bites David as he and James grab her. Before they can kill her, she tells them she is infected, as proven by her bite mark. While they argue whether it is real, Ellie kills James with a meat cleaver and escapes. As David hunts her, she sets fire to the steakhouse. She stabs him with a kitchen knife, but he overpowers and attempts to rape her. Ellie grabs David's fallen meat cleaver and kills him in a frenzied attack. A traumatized Ellie wanders outside and panics when she runs into Joel. Joel embraces and comforts Ellie and they walk away.

Production

Conception and writing 

"When We Are in Need" was written by The Last of Us series co-creator Craig Mazin and directed by Ali Abbasi. Abbasi was announced as one of the show's directors in April 2021. Mazin chose to open the episode with David reading Revelation 21 as it relates to the new world exceeding the old one, and dealing with grief and tragedy. The scene in which David and James attempt to kill Ellie was written similarly to the game as Mazin found it "so visceral".

The decision to move Joel and Ellie reuniting outside the restaurant (as opposed to inside, as in the game) was partly logical—the fire and lock would have prevented Joel from entering—and partly to demonstrate Ellie's ability to physically save herself before Joel saves her emotionally. Series co-creator Neil Druckmann, who wrote and co-directed the video game on which the series is based, felt the effectiveness of the series—like the game—hinged on the viewer feeling the emotion between Joel and Ellie in the conclusion; he considered it effective, as he cried heavily while watching the episode.

Casting and characters 
Ramsey found production on the episode "exhausting" but among her favorite on set. She held a real rifle in the episode and struggled with its weight; some of these moments were included in the episode to reflect Ellie's struggle. Ramsey felt Ellie was attempting to imitate Joel in those scenes, particularly in her handling of the gun and attempts to sound tough. For the scene in which Ellie kills David, Ramsey said Ellie "learns that she really has this capacity for violence" which she finally expresses; she thought Ellie "scares herself because it felt so good". She considered it a turning point for Ellie, and felt she will have post-traumatic stress disorder as a result of her experience.

In June 2022, Druckmann announced Baker—who portrayed Joel in the video games—would feature in the series; his character name was revealed in December. Mazin and Druckmann considered Baker's inclusion in the series important due to his proximity to the games; meanwhile, Baker never assumed he would be involved in the series, except perhaps as a small cameo like a clicker. Upon being approached by Mazin and Druckmann, Baker did not initially remember James from the games; he expected a small role but was surprised by the character's significance upon reading the script.

Baker did not want to portray James as a villain but as someone with truth and empathy, reflected in his inability to shoot Ellie when prompted. He considered James a pragmatist who believes "David is the Devil" and, as a result, wants to remain on his good side; when Ellie's capabilities threaten to usurp James's position alongside David, he becomes defensive. Abbasi directed Baker to pray in the opening scene, but Baker suggested otherwise, noting James "thinks it's all bullshit". He felt James was likely preparing to enter law enforcement when the outbreak occurred, supporting his experience with weaponry and demonstrations of morality.

Prior to the announcement of Shepherd's casting, rumors suggested Baker would play David, but he felt it "would've been too on the nose". Shepherd's casting was revealed in the first trailer in December. Druckmann felt the series allowed a deeper look into the character's complexities than the game; he and Mazin wanted to humanize David in his initial interactions with Ellie, before revealing more of his true actions when he slaps a young girl. Druckmann found David's goal of producing offspring through violence representative of some organized religions, and Mazin noted his goal to "secure a future" reflective of the ideologies of white supremacists.

Filming 
Nadim Carlsen worked as cinematographer for the episode. Production took place in Okotoks in early 2022, with preparatory work from January 31 to February 6, including adding trees, grass, and snow; the area was closed to the public from February 4. Filming occurred from February 7–12, with some traffic disturbance; clean-up took place from February 13–15. Fake horses were spotted on set. Production moved to Waterton Lakes National Park from February 14–18; vehicles on set featured Colorado license plates. The park was closed over winter, allowing production to occur; some cabin interiors were used. Production designer John Paino and his team constructed the steakhouse where David preaches; Paino wanted its symmetry to reflect a church.

Reception

Broadcast and ratings 
The episode aired on HBO on March 5, 2023. The episode had 8.1 million viewers in the United States on its first night, including linear viewers and streams on HBO Max—an increase of 74 percent from the premiere episode. On linear television, it had 1.039 million viewers, with a 0.30 ratings share.

Critical response 

On review aggregator Rotten Tomatoes, "When We Are in Need" has an approval rating of 96 percent based on 26 reviews, with an average rating of 8.5/10. The website's critical consensus noted "Scott Shepherd coolly underplays the personification of evil to chilling effect in ... a horrifying chapter that goes to prove that fungal zombies aren't necessary for this series to instill terror". IndieWires Steve Greene praised the episode's cinematography, particularly the added tension of the close-up shots and maintaining focus on Ellie's reaction while killing David. IGNs Simon Cardy compared the cinematography to picturesque Westerns and modern horror films, and lauded Gustavo Santaolalla's score during Ellie's horseback escape and the production design of David's camp.

Ramsey and Shepherd's performances received particular praise. Den of Geeks Bernard Boo lauded Ramsey's ability to portray toughness while maintaining vulnerability, and The Washington Posts Gene Park wrote her performance "should finally erase" any remaining doubts of her ability. CNETs Sean Keane called Shepherd's performance "charismatic", and IGNs Cardy considered him an effective adversary opposite Ramsey. IndieWires Greene lauded Shepherd's ability to deliver otherwise stereotypical lines; The A.V. Clubs David Cote wrote his performance "is masterful in its wry, understated charm". Bleeding Cools Tom Chang felt Ramsey and Shepherd were unable to match the performances of the game's Ashley Johnson and Nolan North as Ellie and David, respectively, due to the pacing of the script, but wrote they "do their best with what they had to work with". Pascal's performance was well received.

IndieWires Greene praised the ambiguity introduced through Mazin's writing. IGNs Cardy felt the episode's contextual additions justified the adaptation of the game. The Escapists Darren Mooney found Mazin used common tropes in an effective manner to enrich themes and characters. The A.V. Clubs Cote lauded the episode's horrifying construction, attributing it to Mazin's writing and Abbasi's direction; Push Squares Aaron Bayne appreciated the grounded and barren depiction of David's group. The New York Timess Noel Murray admired the realism of Ellie's confusion with penicillin. Several critics considered the episode rushed; Bleeding Cools Chang felt it would have been more effective as a two-parter to allow more time to build David's personality. Total Films Bradley Russell found the final 15 minutes suffered from the rushed pacing, as it effectively remade the scenes from the video game. Den of Geeks Boo opined the story lacked the dramatic impact of the game, considering the religious overtones unnecessary, David's characterization incongruous, and the cannibalism reveal too heavy-handed.

Notes

References

External links 

2023 American television episodes
Television episodes about cannibalism
Television episodes set in Colorado
Television episodes written by Craig Mazin
The Last of Us (TV series) episodes